The , a portmanteau of  and , is the nickname of a central area in Barcelona's Eixample district where, since the end of the 20th century, many gay shops, bars, discos and restaurants have existed. Many LGBTs have settled in this area of the Catalan capital, making it a mecca for LGBT tourists, mainly at night-time.

The Gaixample is bordered by the following streets: Carrer de Balmes, Gran Via de les Corts Catalanes, Carrer del Comte d'Urgell and Carrer d'Aragó. Carrer Diputació between the streets of Aribau and Villarroel has a greater density of gay businesses. Rainbow flags can be seen sometimes in this area.

Several gay-friendly hotels operate in the area.

See also 
 Eixample
 Barcelona
 Catalonia
 Gay village
 List of gay villages
 Gay tourism

References

External links
 ( Map of gaixample on wikimapia ]

Gay villages in Spain
Eixample
Entertainment districts in Spain